Tinker Tailor Soldier Spy is a 2011 Cold War spy thriller film directed by Tomas Alfredson. The screenplay was written by Bridget O'Connor and Peter Straughan, based on John le Carré's 1974 novel of the same name. The film stars Gary Oldman as George Smiley, with Colin Firth, Tom Hardy, John Hurt, Toby Jones, Mark Strong, Benedict Cumberbatch, Ciarán Hinds, David Dencik and Kathy Burke supporting. It is set in London in the early 1970s and follows the hunt for a Soviet double agent at the top of the British secret service.

The film was produced through the British company Working Title Films and financed by France's StudioCanal. It premiered in competition at the 68th Venice International Film Festival. A critical and commercial success, it was the highest-grossing film at the British box office for three consecutive weeks. It won the BAFTA Award for Best British Film. The film also received three Oscar nominations: Best Adapted Screenplay, Best Original Score, and for Oldman, Best Actor.

The novel had previously been adapted into the award-winning 1979 BBC television series of the same name with Alec Guinness playing the lead role of Smiley.

Plot

In 1973 "Control", head of British intelligence ("The Circus"), sends Jim Prideaux to Budapest to meet a Hungarian general who has the name of a mole at the top of British Intelligence. Prideaux, realising the meeting is a trap, is shot as he tries to flee. Control and his right-hand man George Smiley are forced to retire, and Control dies soon after. Percy Alleline becomes the new Chief, Bill Haydon his deputy, and Roy Bland and Toby Esterhase his lieutenants. They had already begun receiving Soviet Intelligence from a secret source (Operation "Witchcraft").

Field agent Ricki Tarr warns undersecretary Oliver Lacon that there is a mole at the top of the Circus. Knowing that Control had the same theory, Lacon asks Smiley to investigate, helped by Tarr's boss Peter Guillam and retired Special Branch officer Mendel.

Smiley interviews analyst Connie Sachs, who was sacked for deducing that Soviet cultural attaché Alexei Polyakov was a military officer and suspecting he was running a mole in London.

Tarr tells Smiley that in Istanbul Soviet agent Irina wanted to exchange the identity of the mole in return for asylum. Hours after Tarr cabled London that a Soviet defector could identify a double agent, the local station chief was murdered and Irina abducted. Fearing for his life, Tarr went into hiding. Smiley sends Guillam to steal the duty officer's logbook for the night Tarr contacted London. Guillam is unexpectedly brought before Circus leadership and told that Tarr is a traitor. Smiley finds that the logbook pages for the relevant night have been removed, supporting Tarr's story. Smiley is convinced the mole is trying to discredit Tarr.

Smiley tells Guillam that in 1955 he had urged Moscow's spymaster Karla to defect, begging him to "think of his wife" and realised too late that he had revealed his own weak spot: his love for his wife. Former duty officer Jerry Westerby tells Smiley of how Prideaux's shooting sent Control into shock. Westerby left a message with Ann Smiley - Haydon then arrived and took charge. Guillam wonders how Haydon could have learned of the emergency, but Smiley tells him Haydon was having an affair with Ann.

Prideaux, who is in fact alive and now a schoolmaster, tells Smiley that his Budapest mission was to relay the identity of the mole to Control, via one of the code names assigned by Control to each of the members of the Circus suspected to be the mole - “Tinker”, “Tailor”, “Soldier”, “Poorman” and “Beggarman”. He was tortured by the KGB, and saw Irina shot in front of him.

Smiley informs Lacon and the Minister that Operation Witchcraft is a ruse. The service believes Polyakov is bringing it Russian secrets, when in reality the mole is using the meets to send British secrets to Karla. The high quality of Witchcraft's intelligence is designed to lure the CIA into sharing intelligence with Britain, which the mole can then also leak to Karla.

Smiley threatens Esterhase with deportation to obtain the Witchcraft safe house address. Tarr visits the Paris station and informs London that he has vital information. Smiley waits at the safe house for the mole to alert Polyakov that Tarr is about to blow their cover, and arrests Haydon at gunpoint. Haydon later confirms that he seduced Ann on Karla's orders to cloud Smiley's judgement. After Smiley's departure Prideaux shoots and kills Haydon from a distance. Ann returns home, and Smiley returns to the Circus as its Chief.

Cast

Production

Development
The project was initiated by Peter Morgan when he wrote a draft of the screenplay, which he offered to Working Title Films to produce. Morgan dropped out as the writer for personal reasons but still served as an executive producer. Following Morgan's departure as writer, Working Title hired Peter Straughan and Bridget O'Connor to redraft the script. Park Chan-wook considered directing the film, but ultimately turned it down. Tomas Alfredson was confirmed to direct on 9 July 2009. The production is his first English language film. The film was backed financially by France's StudioCanal and had a budget corresponding to $21 million. The film is dedicated to O'Connor, who died of cancer during production.

Casting
The director cast Gary Oldman in the role of George Smiley, and described the actor as having "a great face" and "the quiet intensity and intelligence that's needed". Many actors were connected to the other roles at various points, but only days before filming started, Oldman was still the only lead actor who officially had been contracted. David Thewlis was in talks for a role early on. Michael Fassbender was in talks at one point to star as Ricki Tarr, but the shooting schedule conflicted with his work on X-Men: First Class; Tom Hardy was cast instead. On 17 September 2010, Mark Strong was confirmed to have joined the cast. Jared Harris was cast but had to drop out because of scheduling conflicts with Sherlock Holmes: A Game of Shadows; he was replaced by Toby Jones. John le Carré appears in a cameo as a guest in a party scene.

Filming
Principal photography took place between 7 October and 22 December 2010. Studio scenes were shot at a former army barracks in Mill Hill, North London. Blythe House in Kensington Olympia, West London, was used as the exterior for "The Circus." The interior hall of Budapest's Párizsi Udvar ("Paris Court") served as the location for the café scene in which Jim Prideaux is shot. Empress Coach Works in Haggerston was used as the location for the Merlin safe house. Other scenes were filmed on Hampstead Heath and in Hampstead Ponds, where Smiley is shown swimming, and in the physics department of Imperial College London.

The events which take place in Czechoslovakia in the novel were moved to Hungary, because of the country's 20% rebate for film productions. The teams filmed in Budapest for five days. Right before Christmas, the team also filmed in Istanbul for nine days. The production reunited Alfredson with cinematographer Hoyte van Hoytema and editor Dino Jonsäter, with whom he had made his previous film Let the Right One In.

Post-production and music
The film took six months to edit. The final song in the film, Julio Iglesias' rendition of the French song "La Mer", set against a visual montage of various characters and subplots being resolved as Smiley strides into Circus headquarters to assume command, was chosen because it was something the team thought George Smiley would listen to when he was alone; Alfredson described the song as "everything that the world of MI6 isn't". A scene where Smiley listens to the song was filmed, but eventually cut to avoid giving it too much significance.

Heard at a Circus office party, sung along to by the guests, is "The Second Best Secret Agent in the Whole Wide World", composed by Sammy Cahn and Jimmy Van Heusen, and performed by Sammy Davis Jr., from the British spy spoof Licensed to Kill (1965). At the same office Christmas function, the Circus staff sing the official "State Anthem of the USSR", conducted by a figure dressed as Father Christmas but wearing a Lenin mask.

Release and reception

The film premiered in competition at the 68th Venice International Film Festival on 5 September 2011. StudioCanal UK distributed the film in the United Kingdom, where it was released on 16 September 2011. The US rights were acquired by Universal Pictures, which owns Working Title, and they passed the rights to their subsidiary Focus Features. Focus planned to give the film a wide release in the United States on 9 December 2011 but pushed it to January 2012, when it was given an 800 screen release.

The film was released in France on 8 February 2012 under the title La Taupe (meaning "The Mole").

Critical response
Tinker Tailor Soldier Spy received critical acclaim. Rotten Tomatoes reports an approval rating of 83% based on 229 reviews, with an average rating of 7.80/10. The site's critics' consensus states: "Tinker Tailor Soldier Spy is a dense puzzle of anxiety, paranoia, and espionage that director Tomas Alfredson pieces together with utmost skill." Metacritic, which assigns a normalised rating in the 0–100 range based on reviews from top mainstream critics, calculated an average score of 85 based on 42 reviews, indicating "universal acclaim".

Jonathan Romney of The Independent wrote, "The script is a brilliant feat of condensation and restructuring: writers Peter Straughan and the late Bridget O'Connor realise the novel is overtly about information and its flow, and reshape its daunting complexity to highlight that". David Gritten of The Daily Telegraph declared the film "a triumph" and gave it a five star rating, as did his colleague, Sukhdev Sandhu. Stateside, Peter Travers of Rolling Stone wrote, "As Alfredson directs the expert script by Peter Straughan and Bridget O'Connor, the film emerges as a tale of loneliness and desperation among men who can never disclose their secret hearts, even to themselves. It's easily one of the year's best films." M. Enois Duarte of High-Def Digest also praised the film as a "brilliant display of drama, mystery and suspense, one which regards its audience with intelligence".

Writing in The Atlantic, le Carré admirer James Parker favourably contrasted Smiley with the James Bond franchise but found this Tinker Tailor adaptation "problematic" compared with the 1979 BBC mini-series. He wrote: "To strip down or minimalize le Carré, however, is to sacrifice the almost Tolkienesque grain and depth of his created world: the decades-long backstory, the lingo, the arcana, the liturgical repetitions of names and functions".

Keith Uhlich of Time Out New York named Tinker Tailor Soldier Spy the fourth-best film of 2011, calling it "a visually stunning adaptation with a stellar cast." In 2020, Uhlich named it the ninth-best film of the 2010s.

Box office
The film topped the British box office chart for three consecutive weeks and earned $80,630,608 worldwide.

Awards and honours

Possible sequel
While doing press for Working Title's Les Misérables film adaptation, producer Eric Fellner stated that fellow producer Tim Bevan was working with writer Straughan and director Alfredson on developing a sequel to Tinker Tailor Soldier Spy. Fellner did not specify whether or not the sequel would be based on The Honourable Schoolboy or Smiley's People, the two remaining Smiley novels in Le Carré's Karla trilogy. While doing press for Dawn of the Planet of the Apes in 2014, Oldman stated that talk of a sequel, an adaptation of Smiley's People, had since disappeared; while also stressing that he would still like to see the film produced.

In July 2016, Oldman said that a sequel was in its early stages, stating, "There is a script, but I don't know when we will shoot." It was reported at the time that a script based on Smiley's People had been "greenlit" by Working Title Films.

In December 2021, Alfredson said that a film sequel to the 2011 film was unlikely; the rights having reverted to Le Carré's estate, who were planning to reboot Smiley on television. Alfredson expressed an interest in directing Oldman in a future TV miniseries adaptation of Smiley's People but he thought that the moment had likely passed.

References

External links

 
 
 

2011 films
2010s spy thriller films
British spy thriller films
French spy thriller films
Films directed by Tomas Alfredson
Films based on works by John le Carré
Cold War spy films
Films set in 1973
Films set in 1974
Films set in London
Films set in Paris
Films set in Istanbul
Films set in Budapest
Films shot in Budapest
Films shot in London
Films shot in Turkey
StudioCanal films
Working Title Films films
BAFTA winners (films)
Best British Film BAFTA Award winners
Films whose writer won the Best Adapted Screenplay BAFTA Award
Films produced by Eric Fellner
Films about the Secret Intelligence Service
Films produced by Tim Bevan
Films scored by Alberto Iglesias
2010s English-language films
2010s British films
2010s French films